William Ivey or Bill Ivey may refer to:

 Bill Ivey, American folklorist
 William Ivey (agricultural scientist) (1838–1892), New Zealand agricultural scientist and director
 William Ivey (painter) (1919–1992), American Abstract Expressionist painter

See also
 William Ivey Long (born 1947), American costume designer